"Pummilla Tallinnaan" is a song by Finnish rapper Tuomas Kauhanen featuring Mikko (full name Mikko Björk). The song peaked at number one on the Finnish Singles Chart.

Chart performance

References

Finnish songs
2014 singles
Number-one singles in Finland
2014 songs
Warner Music Group singles